Pol-e Gel Kani (also Romanized as  Pol-e Gel Kanī; also known as Gel Kan-e Pahel, Golkan Pol, Pīr Ḩarīreh, Pol-e Gelkan, and Pol-e Gel Kan) is a village in Khamir Rural District, in the Central District of Khamir County, Hormozgan Province, Iran. At the 2006 census, its population was 628, in 133 families.

References 

Populated places in Khamir County